The 2000–01 Munster Rugby season was Munster's sixth season as a professional team, during which they competed in the IRFU Interprovincial Championship and Heineken Cup. It was Declan Kidney's third season in his first spell as head coach of the province.

2000–01 squad

2000–01 IRFU Interprovincial Championship

2000–01 Heineken Cup

Pool 4

Quarter-final

Semi-final

References

External links
2000–01 Munster Rugby season official site 
2000–01 Munster Rugby Heineken Cup fixtures

2000–01
2000–01 in Irish rugby union